Helen Diane Foster represented District 16 in the New York City Council, which comprises the neighborhoods of Morrisania, Highbridge, and Morris Heights for 11 years. She was the first Black woman to be elected within Bronx County. She served as the commissioner for the New York State Division of Human Rights from September 2013 until April 2019 and was appointed to the post by Governor Andrew Cuomo.

Education
Foster holds degrees from Howard University and CUNY School of Law.

Career
Elected in 2001, she replaced her father, Rev. Wendell Foster, who was forced to retire from the city council due to term limits. With her election she became the first African-American woman to be elected within Bronx County. During her tenure on the city council, Foster served as chairwoman of the Parks & Recreation Committee, and served as a member of the Aging, Education, Health, Lower Manhattan Redevelopment, and Public Safety Committees.

Prior to her election to the council, Foster was an assistant district attorney in the Manhattan District Attorney's office, subsequent to which she became an assistant vice-president for legal affairs at St. Barnabas Hospital.

She serves on the board of trustees for Christ Church.

Remarks on police shooting
In the wake of the murder of Sean Bell, Foster made a series of comments that criticized the NYPD, declaring that the shooting itself was an illustration of racism within the city's police department.

Personal life
Foster resides in Bronx County with her husband, Eric McKay, and their two children.

References

External links
 Official NYC Council Website about Helen Foster
Council Speaker Is Accused Of Stalling Lead Paint Bill
New York City District 16
City Got Yanked Around

New York City Council members
Living people
New York (state) Democrats
Year of birth missing (living people)
Place of birth missing (living people)
2008 United States presidential electors
Women New York City Council members
21st-century American women politicians
21st-century American politicians
Politicians from the Bronx
African-American New York City Council members